The Hyderabad Airport Express Metro or Corridor IV is an under-construction Hyderabad Metro line from Raidurg metro station to Rajiv Gandhi International Airport. The total length of the line is 31 km.

History
On 26 March 2018, a special purpose vehicle company, Hyderabad Airport Metro Limited (HAML), was established by the Government of Telangana to develop the Hyderabad Airport Metro Express. HMRL Managing Director N.V.S. Reddy (Venkatsatyanarayan Reddy Nallamilli) is also Managing Director of HAML, which is jointly promoted by HMRL , Hyderabad Metropolitan Development Authority (HMDA) and Telangana State Industrial Infrastructure Corporation (TSIIC). In August 2019, TRS Working President, Minister for Municipal Administration & Urban Development, Industries and IT&C K. T. Rama Rao said that the work on Hyderabad Metro Airport Express from Raheja Mindspace to Shamshabad RGI Airport will start soon. The alignment to Shamshabad RGI Airport from the Raidurg metro station will be through the new Khajaguda Link Road (Beside CARE Hospitals). In March 2021, the Government of Telangana allocated  1,000 crore for Hyderabad Metro Rail Ltd in the 2021-2022 state budget. In September 2021, GMR Group, the company operating the Rajiv Gandhi International Airport (RGIA) in Hyderabad said that it will invest  519.52 crore towards metro connectivity at the airport.

In March 2022, Government of Telangana  allocated  to the Hyderabad Metro Rail (HMR) in the 2022-2023 state budget. The Government of Telangana announced funds worth  1,500 crore for the Hyderabad Metro Rail for taking up land acquisition, preparation of detailed project reports and other developmental work,  377.35 crore for Airport Metro connectivity and  500 crore for Metro connectivity to the old city (for initiating Corridor II- Green Line works from MGBS to Falaknuma; 5.5 km). The 31 km Airport Express Metro Corridor is proposed to have 27 km elevated, 1 km on ground and a 2.5 km underground section to connect to the airport terminal. The airport route will have 9 elevated stations and one underground station. The metro viaduct will cross the junction near IKEA store at about 21 metres (69-ft) high. From Raidurg Metro terminal station, it will pass over Bio-diversity Junction, through Roda Mistry college lane, Khajaguda Junction, touching Outer Ring Road at Nanakramguda junction and traverse along ORR to Shamshabad Airport through the existing dedicated Metro Rail Right-of-Way.

In February 2023, Government of Telangana  allocated  to the Hyderabad Airport Metro Express  in the 2023-2024 state budget. On 18 February 2023,  HMRL Managing Director N.V.S. Reddy informed that Nanakramguda junction metro station will be designed as portal structure with three pillars and the station is required to be close to the junction. Nanakramguda junction metro station will be about 2.5 km from Wipro circle.

Foundation laying ceremony
Chief Minister of Telangana K. Chandrashekar Rao laid the foundation stone for Hyderabad Airport Express Metro at Mindspace Junction on 9 December 2022. Hyderabad Airport Express Metro is a Telangana State Government funded project and will be completed by beginning of 2026. The existing corridor three (Blue line) from Raidurg Station to the new Airport Metro Raidurg Station will be extended by about 900 meters, thus it would be an integrated four-level station, somewhat similar to JBS Station of metro corridor-2 (Green line) and Ameerpet interchange station. The extended blue line terminal station and the Airport Metro station is planned as a combined interchange station one over the other. The combined interchange station design is due to space constraints in front of L&T and Aurobindo buildings after IKEA junction. The first two levels will accommodate Airport Metro station and the top two levels will accommodate the extended blue line (Corridor 3) terminal station.

Pre-construction survey work for alignment finalization 
In December 2022,  Hyderabad Airport Metro Ltd (HAML) engaged two survey teams to gather ground data for alignment finalization and determining the station locations. In January 2023, K. T. Rama Rao sought Central Government’s in-principle approval for Hyderabad airport express metro project. To expedite grounding of Hyderabad airport metro works, this pre-construction activity was taken up simultaneously. The survey work is done by using both the satellite based Differential GPS and the Electronic Total station. Till 14 January 2023, the survey of 21 km from Raidurg metro station to Fort Grand underpass near Shamshabad was completed and remaining 10 km will be completed by January 2023 end. Thereafter, peg marking of the airport metro alignment will start. On 31 January 2023,  HMRL Managing Director N.V.S. Reddy informed that Metro pillars will be located in the central median of the widened service road from Nanakramguda junction to TSPA (APPA) junction. On 28 February 2023, HMRL Managing Director N.V.S. Reddy informed that survey for the airport Metro corridor is completed and peg marking of its alignment on the ground has begun. Aluminium boards with a retro-reflective sheet for visibility at night are also being embedded in the central median.

Selection of General Consultant
On 3 December 2022, Hyderabad Airport Metro Limited (HAML) invited Expression of Interest (EoI cum RfQ) for selection of General Consultant (GC) for the Design and Build (DB) of Airport Express. Technical experts and field engineers with sound domain knowledge and experience will be in the GC, to work in tandem with the techno-managerial team of HAML. The last date for Submission of EOI is December 13, 2022, and the last date for bid submission is January 20, 2023. Pre Application Conference for this was held in Hyderabad on 6 December 2022 , Marigold Hotel, Green Lands, Begumpet. About 23 reputed national and international engineering consultancy firms  participated in the meeting. By 21 December 2022, 5 consortiums applied for the Request for qualifications (RfQ) for the General Consultants (GC) for the Hyderabad Airport Metro project. 

On 28 December 2022, after evaluation of their applications, Hyderabad Airport Metro Limited (HAML) declared that all the five consortia 
had qualified to participate in the next stage bid documents i.e., the Request for proposal (RfP) and they will have to submit their bids by January 20, 2023.

Selection of Consultant for marking right of way (RoW)
In December 2022, Hyderabad Airport Metro Limited (HAML) invited bids for clearing vegetation and marking right-of-way (RoW) from Mindspace Junction to RGIA Airport. Consultants would be asked to finish the project within three months. The successful bidder would not be allowed to chop trees.

Finances
Hyderabad Metropolitan Development Authority (HMDA) and GMR Group contributed  each, or 10 per cent of the project's cost.

Stations

Benefits beyond airport connectivity
Air passengers will be able to check-in and part with their baggage at Raidurg metro station itself and reach the Boarding gates directly at Rajiv Gandhi International Airport. Multi-location check-in facility at the metro station will be crucial public transport link for southern Hyderabad and suburban areas. The Hyderabad airport Express metro will provide a crucial link for the GMR Aerocity Hyderabad at Adibatla and proposed Hyderabad Pharma City. The travelling time from Mindspace junction to Hyderabad airport will be 26 minutes. There will be a provision of half-height platform screen doors (PSD) for improved passenger safety.  There will be bolster-less bogies and Automated fare collection (AFC) gates at each station. In order to keep passengers informed about the flights, there will be a Flight information display system (FIDS) and information desk at all Hyderabad airport metro stations. The Hyderabad Airport Express Metro's airport station will be underneath the passenger terminal and will transport passengers to the gates through lifts, escalators and stairs.

The Airport Metro connects several residential areas along its route like Rajendranagar, Budwel, Narsingi, Kismatpur, TS Police Academy, Shamshabad etc. This area houses around 5 Lakh people. Airport Metro project is planned as an opportunity to facilitate development of city outskirts for providing affordable housing for lower income groups and better accommodation for middle class at lower costs. The project is designed not only for Airport passengers but also for reverse commute of those who stay in extended parts of the city to reach their work places in city within about 20 minutes. Vacant Government land parcels would be identified near stations to provide good parking facilities. Multi-armed Skywalks with landings on all sides of junctions will be provided for easy access and to make Airport Metro a preferred commute option. Airport Metro is being dovetailed to facilitate and cater to this unprecedented growth of Hyderabad.

See also 
Transport in Hyderabad
Hyderabad Multi-Modal Transport System
Airport Express (MTR)
Namma Metro ORR-Airport Metro Line
Delhi Airport Metro Express
Mumbai Airport Express Line

References

External links 

Airport rail links in India